Lavocatisaurus (meaning "René Lavocat's lizard") is a genus of sauropod in the family Rebbachisauridae from the Early Cretaceous (Aptian to Albian) Rayoso Formation of the Neuquén Basin, northern Patagonia, Argentina.

Description 

Lavocatisaurus was a medium-sized sauropod, and one of the only known dinosaurs from the Rayoso Formation. It is known from almost all of its anatomical elements, and it is known from a few specimens including juveniles and an adult. The adult specimen is currently under preparation, and thus the described fossils come from a number of juvenile individuals.  The skull was elongate and similar in shape to that of Diplodocus. The skull is well preserved for the most part, and it provides further evidence that some sauropods may have had a beak-like keratinous sheath covering the anterior of the snout.

Classification 
In their phylogenetic analysis Canudo et al. (2018) found Lavocatisaurus to be a basal rebbachisaurid. They resolved it in a derived position relative to other basal rebbachisaurids, as the sister group to the Khebbashia, the clade formed by Rebbachisaurinae and Limaysaurinae.

References 

Rebbachisaurids
Albian life
Aptian life
Early Cretaceous dinosaurs of South America
Cretaceous Argentina
Fossils of Argentina
Neuquén Basin
Fossil taxa described in 2018